Life Bar is a South Korean Talk show distributed by tvN every Saturday at 10:50 pm. Season 1 broadcast its final episode on April 13, 2017. Season 2 premiered on May 18, 2017.

, 118 episodes of Life Bar have been aired.

Series overview

Episodes

2016

2017

2018

2019

References

Lists of variety television series episodes
Lists of South Korean television series episodes